Samuel B. Stauber Farm is a historic farm complex and national historic district located near Bethania, Forsyth County, North Carolina.  The district encompasses five contributing buildings dated between about 1852 and 1900.  They include the two-story, three bay Greek Revival style farmhouse (1852); barn (c. 1847/1852); a slave dwelling (c. 1852); a mid-to-late 19th century smokehouse; and a corn crib / granary.

It was listed on the National Register of Historic Places in 1988.

References

Farms on the National Register of Historic Places in North Carolina
Historic districts on the National Register of Historic Places in North Carolina
Greek Revival houses in North Carolina
Houses in Forsyth County, North Carolina
National Register of Historic Places in Forsyth County, North Carolina
1852 establishments in North Carolina